Superia is a fictional character in the Marvel Comics universe.

Superia may also refer to:
 Superia (video game), a Norwegian game based on Adventure Rock
 Fujifilm Superia, a popular brand of film
 Superior craton or Superia

See also
Superior (disambiguation)